Alcohol dehydrogenase 1A is an enzyme that in humans is encoded by the ADH1A gene.

This gene encodes class I alcohol dehydrogenase, alpha subunit, which is a member of the alcohol dehydrogenase family. Members of this enzyme family metabolize a wide variety of substrates, including ethanol, retinol, other aliphatic alcohols, hydroxysteroids, and lipid peroxidation products. Class I alcohol dehydrogenase, consisting of several homo- and heterodimers of alpha, beta, and gamma subunits, exhibits high activity for ethanol oxidation and plays a major role in ethanol catabolism. Three genes encoding alpha, beta and gamma subunits are tandemly organized in a genomic segment as a gene cluster. This gene is monomorphic and predominant in fetal and infant livers, whereas the genes encoding beta and gamma subunits are polymorphic and strongly expressed in adult livers.

References

Further reading

External links